West Perth is a municipality in Ontario, Canada, situated in Western Perth County, just west of the city of Stratford. In 2016, its population was 8,865 in a land area of 579.36 square kilometers. The former town of Mitchell and townships of Logan, Hibbert, and Fullarton all amalgamated into this single large municipality on January 1, 1998. Municipal offices, administration, and services are based in Mitchell. Its mayor is Walter McKenzie.

History

Town of Mitchell 

According to a historic plaque erected by the Province, the Canada Company laid out a town plot (Mitchell) on the Huron Road in 1836. In 1837 a log building was built by William Hicks along Huron Road; he was the first settler in the area.  A sawmill was built in 1842 and in 1845, stores and other mills opened. By 1851 the population had reached 150. Mitchell was incorporated as a Village in 1857 after the railway reached the area. Mitchell became a Town in 1874, with a population of 2000. The first mayor was Thomas Matheson. A waterworks system was completed in 1889; roadways and sidewalks were paved that year. Electricity arrived in 1889. By 1901, the population had grown to 2,200 and in 1918, a large new elementary school was necessary. A high school was built soon after.

Logan Township 
In 1827, Logan Township was named after Hart Logan, a director of the Canada Company.  The first settler to Logan township arrived in 1836.  It began to grow considerably when British pioneers arrived in the 1850s; a large German population would begin to arrive in 1853 and settle at Brodhagen. A small village formed in Bornholm and a large inn was built there.

Hibbert Township 
This township was named after William Hibbert, a director of the Canada Company.  The first settler arrived prior to 1840 and built a tavern.  Although the township was slow in settling, the local economy was strong as a result of rich soil, growing industry and access to transportation for marketing the local produce.  One room school houses were in operation until the 1960s after which students began bussing to centralized public and separate schools. The ethnic mix in the area includes English, Dutch, Irish and Scottish.

Fullarton Township 
This township was named after John Fullarton, a director of the Canada Company.  The first settler, High Kennedy Junck, arrived in 1832 and later opened a sawmill. Subsequent settlers came from Alsace-Lorraine first and later, in the 1840s, from England, Ireland and Scotland arrived. The town was experiencing major growth in the next decade. A full 3,000 people lived in this area by 1870. According to Stratford-Perth Archives records, the booming town was serviced by "seven schools, many churches, and small businesses such as blacksmithies, wagon and harness makers, country stores, a cheese and butter factory, grist and saw mills, and several hotel taverns". Then, as now, this was primarily an agricultural area.

Municipal Restructuring 
As part of provincial initiatives in the late 1990s, the Government of Ontario pursued a policy of municipal amalgamations to rationalize municipal levels of government services and  "reduc[e] government entanglement and bureaucracy with an eye to eliminating waste and duplication as well as unfair downloading by the province".  On June 26, 1997, an order from the Ontario Minister of Municipal Affairs for the amalgamation of the former Townships of Logan, Hibbert, Fullarton and the Town of Mitchell into the Township of West Perth received Royal assent.  The amalgamation came into effect on January 1, 1998.

Communities
Mitchell is the largest community within the municipality. Smaller communities include:

 Bornholm
 Brodhagen - named for German settler Charles Broadhagen who arrived in 1860s
 Dublin - named for hometown of settler Joseph Kidd and was originally known as Carronbrook
 Fullarton - named for John Fullarton Director of Canada Company
 Mitchell
 Russeldale
 St. Columban
 Staffa - named for Scottish island in Inner Hebrides

Demographics 

According to the 2011 census, children aged 9 and under accounted for approximately 13.3% of West Perth's population, while the percentage at retirement age (65 and over) is approximately 15%. The median age is 39 years of age.

According to the 2011 National Household Survey, 6.3% of the population have immigrant status.  The most common countries immigrants come from are the Netherlands (34.2%) and the United Kingdom (19.8%).

According to the 2011 National Household Survey, the majority of residents of West Perth are members of a Christian faith and account for 84.6% of the population.  The remaining population (11.8%) reports no religious affiliation.  Of the Christian population, the largest religious affiliation is Roman Catholic (28.2%) followed by Lutheran (22.6%), United Church (21.4%), Presbyterian (8.9%), Anglican (3.8%), Pentecostal (1.6%), Baptist (0.8%) and other Christian (12.2%).

Economy 
According to the 2011 National Household Survey, the largest economic sectors by number of workers employed are manufacturing (800 workers); health care and social assistance (660 workers) and construction (445 workers).  Other industries in the region employing more than 200 workers are wholesale trade, retail trade, and transportation and warehousing.

The average income reported in the 2011 National Household Survey was $36,525 with an average after-tax income of $31,711.

West Perth is home to industries that include Cooper Standard Automotive, Armtec Durisol, Parmalat, Sofina and leading Animal Pharmaceutical producer BioAgriMix. The latter company opened about 30 years ago and by 2014 was Canada's largest producer of Animal Pharmaceutical products.

Government

Local Government 
The Municipality of West Perth has a Mayor, Deputy Mayor and nine Councillors. Council positions are held for a four-year term.  Councillors represent the wards of Fullarton, Hibbert, Logan and Mitchell.

Township operations are overseen by the Chief Administrator's Office and municipal departments include Building and Zoning Services, By-law enforcement, Finance & Treasury, Fire Service, Garbage/Recycling, and Public Works.  The Chief Administrative Officer is Jeff Brick, who started in September 2015.

Township Council 2022-2026

County Government 
Because West Perth is part of the upper-tier municipality Perth County, Ontario, it has representation on the County Council.  The Perth County Council is determined by a restructuring order that came into force on January 1, 1998.  Under this order, the Perth East has two members appointed to the County Council.  West Perth Mayor Walter McKenzie and Deputy Mayor Doug Eldt serve as this township's representatives on County Council.

Provincial Government 
Perth—Wellington is a provincial electoral district in Ontario, Canada, that has been represented in the Legislative Assembly of Ontario since the 2007 provincial election.  It was created in 2003 from parts of Dufferin—Peel—Wellington—Grey, Perth—Middlesex and Waterloo—Wellington ridings.

It consists of the County of Perth, and the Town of Minto and the townships of Mapleton and Wellington North in the County of Wellington.  As of October 6, 2011, the MPP for the riding is Randy Pettapiece.

Federal Government 
Perth—Wellington is a federal electoral district in Ontario, Canada, that has been represented in the House of Commons of Canada since 2004.  It was created in 2003 from parts of Dufferin—Peel—Wellington—Grey, Perth—Middlesex and Waterloo—Wellington ridings.

It consists of the County of Perth, the City of Stratford, the Town of St. Mary's and the Town of Minto and the townships of Mapleton and Wellington North in the County of Wellington.

See also
List of townships in Ontario
Perth County, Ontario

References

External links

Lower-tier municipalities in Ontario
Municipalities in Perth County, Ontario